David C. Cross Jr. (December 19, 1935 - May 29, 2019) was a Canadian-born Canadian Horse Racing Hall of Fame trainer of Thoroughbred racehorses who race-conditioned the Canadian-bred colt Sunny's Halo to wins in the 1983 Kentucky Derby, Arkansas Derby and Super Derby.

David Cross was raised in the Victoria and Vancouver, British Columbia areas and saddled his first winner in 1957 at Longacres racetrack.

He made his second appearance in the Kentucky Derby in 1991, finishing sixth with Quintana. In his only other Triple Crown appearance, for owner Gary Garber he trained Classic Cat to a third-place finish in the 1998 Preakness Stakes.

David Cross retired in 2000 but returned to training Thorughbreds in 2004 before retiring permanently on July 23, 2012, saddling his last runner that day at Fort Erie Race Track.

External links
 Horse Racing Radio Network,  January 13, 2016 Jude Feld interview with David C. Cross Jr.

References

1935 births
2019 deaths
American horse trainers
Canadian horse trainers
Canadian Horse Racing Hall of Fame inductees